Tigga may refer to:
Manoj Tigga, Indian politician
Shanti Tigga, soldier
Torra Tigga railway station